Fluid Motorsport Development constructs the Sinter Formula Ford car. The company also fielded a racing team in British Formula Ford between 2002 and 2012. Fluid Motorsport was also active in British Formula 3 as a team between 2005 and 2008.

History
Lindsay Allen was a race engineer for various teams and worked on various cars. In the off-season he would work at Van Diemen before setting up Nexa Racing in 2002. Nexa Racing was founded by Lindsay Allen and fellow former Van Diemen engineer Roger Littin.  Their first success came in their first season in British Formula Ford. Swede Sebastian Hohenthal won the Winter Series championship. For 2003 Finnish talent Valle Mäkelä was signed. After a third place in 2003, Mäkelä won the 2004 championship with 10 wins out of 20 races.

Fluid Motorsport entered British Formula 3 in 2005. The team entered a single Lola-Dome F106/4 for Ben Clucas in the National class. Running a partial schedule, Clucas had one class victory at Monza. More Formula 3 success came in 2006 with Cristiano Morgado. Running full-time in the series Morgado won four races and was placed runner-up in the National class behind Rodolfo González. The following season the team graduated to the Championship class. With South-African Sean Petterson driving their nr. 32 entry. In ten races Petterson finished in the top 20 only twice. Mexican Juan Pablo Garcia ran for the team in the National class, also without significant results. For the 2008 British Formula 3 season the team entered Stefan Wilson and Jay Bridger in the National class driving Dallara F307's. Bridger won the class championship and Wilson was placed fourth.

In British Formula Ford the team also achieved some success with David Brown and Marco Sørensen. Brown even won the last two races of the season at Donington Park. Fluid Motorsport fielded three full-time drivers for the 2009 season. Garry Findlay and Ben Barker in the Championship class and Fabio Gamberini in the Scholarship class. Findlay scored one win and nine podium finishes thus placing him third in the standings. Gamberini had success in his class with a third place in the championship. For the 2010 season the team started to develop their own Formula Ford cars, updating Van Diemen DP08's into Van Diemen LA08's, LA being the initials of Lindsay Allen. The team entered various drivers during the season. Dennis Lind drove for the team at the Formula Ford Festival. He won the prestigious race and gave Fluid Motorsport Development its first Festival win. The 2011 British Formula Ford season was the last regular season of the British Formula Ford before switching to the Ford EcoBoost engine. Matt Parry and Matt Rao drove for the team but with little success. Matt Rao stayed on the team for the 2012 season. Fluid Motorsport Development entered the sub-class for Duratec powered cars. Matt Rao won the Duratec championship.

With the EcoBoost Formula Ford era started, Fluid Motorsport Development constructed their first Formula Ford car. The Sinter LA12 was scheduled to compete in the 2012 British Formula Ford season but the organisation changed the regulations again for the 2013 season. The new Formula Ford had to feature aerodynamic aids like front- and rear-wings. SWB Motorsport and Radical Sportscars entered Sinters into the first race of the 2013 season. But after disappointing results, the Radical team switched to rival chassis maker Mygale.

Racing cars

References

External links
 Official website

British racecar constructors
British auto racing teams
Formula Ford cars
British Formula Three teams
Companies established in 2004
Companies based in Suffolk
British Formula Renault teams
Formula BMW teams
Auto racing teams established in 2002
Auto racing teams established in 2004
Auto racing teams disestablished in 2012